A congressional caucus is a group of members of the United States Congress that meet to pursue common legislative objectives. Formally, caucuses are formed as congressional member organizations (CMOs) through the United States House of Representatives and the United States Senate and governed under the rules of these chambers. In addition to the term "caucus", they are sometimes called conferences (especially Republican ones), coalitions, study groups, task forces, or working groups. Many other countries use the term parliamentary group; the Parliament of the United Kingdom has many all-party parliamentary groups.

Party caucuses and conferences in the United States Congress 
The largest caucuses are the party caucuses and conferences in the United States Congress, which are the partisan caucuses comprising all members of one house from one party (either the Democrats or the Republicans) in addition to any independent members who may caucus with either party. These are the House Democratic Caucus, House Republican Conference, Senate Democratic Caucus and Senate Republican Conference. The caucuses meet regularly in closed sessions for both the House of Representatives and the Senate to set legislative agendas, select committee members and chairs and hold elections to choose various floor leaders. They also oversee the four Hill committees, political party committees that work to elect members of their own party to Congress.

Ideological conferences 

Ideological congressional caucuses can represent a political party within a political party. In the United States two-party dominant political system, these congressional caucuses help congregate and advance the ideals of a more focused ideology within the two major relatively big tent political parties. Some caucuses are organized political factions with a common ideological orientation. Most ideological caucuses are confined to the House of Representatives.

Racial and ethnic caucuses 
Among the most visible caucuses are those composed of members sharing the same race or ethnic group. The most high profile of these represent people of color. The Congressional Black Caucus, Congressional Hispanic Caucus, and the Congressional Asian Pacific American Caucus also form the Congressional Tri Caucus when they sit together.
 The Congressional Black Caucus for African-Americans
 The two Hispanic caucuses:
 The Congressional Hispanic Caucus for Hispanic Democrats only (Hispanic Republicans are barred from membership per 2000s rule change)
 The Congressional Hispanic Conference for Hispanic Republicans, who formerly belonged to the Hispanic Caucus but later split off to form the Hispanic Conference
 The Congressional Asian Pacific American Caucus represents members who are Asian Americans and Pacific Islanders but are open to other members as well

LGBT+ caucus 
The formation of the Congressional LGBT Equality Caucus was announced on June 4, 2008, by openly gay members of congress Tammy Baldwin and Barney Frank. The mission of the caucus is to work for LGBT rights, the repeal of laws discriminatory against LGBT persons, the elimination of hate-motivated violence, and improved health and well-being for all persons, regardless of sexual orientation, gender identity, or gender expression. The caucus serves as a resource for Members of Congress, their staffs, and the public on LGBT issues.

The LGBT Equality Caucus admits any member who is willing to advance LGBT rights, regardless of their sexual identity or orientation; it has historically been co-chaired by every openly-LGBT member of the House. The caucus had 194 members, all of them Democrats, in the 118th United States Congress.

Interest group caucuses 
The most common caucuses consist of members united as an interest group. These are often bipartisan (comprising both Democrats and Republicans) and bicameral (comprising both Representatives and Senators). Examples like the Congressional Bike Caucus works to promote cycling and the Senate Taiwan Caucus promotes strong relationships with Taiwan.

Rules 
The House Committee on House Administration (HCHA) prescribes certain rules for Congressional Member Organizations (CMOs). Each Congress, CMOs must electronically register with the Committee on House Administration, providing the name of the caucus, a statement of purpose, the CMO officers and the employee designated to work on issues related to the CMO. The HCHA rules include the following:
 Members of both the House and Senate may participate in CMO, but at least one of the officers of the CMO must be a Member of the House. The participation of Senators in a CMO does not impact the scope of authorized CMO activities in any regard.
 CMOs have no separate corporate or legal identity. A CMO is not an employing authority. The Members' Representational Allowance may not directly support a CMO as an independent entity. A CMO may not be assigned separate office space.
 Neither CMOs nor individual members may accept goods, funds, or services from private organizations or individuals to support the CMO. Members may use personal funds to support the CMO.
 A member of a CMO may utilize employees (including shared employees) and official resources under the control of the member to assist the CMO in carrying out its legislative objectives, but no employees may be appointed in the name of a CMO.
 CMOs may not use the frank (congressional free mailing) privilege, nor may a member lend their frank to a CMO.
 A member may use official resources for communications related to the purpose of a CMO. Any such communications must comply with the franking regulations.
 Members may devote a section of their official website to CMO issues, but CMOs may not have independent web pages.
 A member may use inside mail to communicate information related to a CMO.
 Members may prepare material related to CMO issues for dissemination.
 Official funds may not be used to print or pay for stationery for the CMO.
 Members may refer to their membership in a CMO on their official stationery.

See also 
 All-party parliamentary group
 Caucuses of the United States Congress
 Factions in the Democratic Party (United States)
 Factions in the Republican Party (United States)

Notes

References 

 
Political organizations based in the United States
Issue-based groups of legislators